Georgiana Dedu (born 20 January 1996) is a Romanian rower. She competed in the women's eight event at the 2020 Summer Olympics.

References

External links
 

1996 births
Living people
Romanian female rowers
Olympic rowers of Romania
Rowers at the 2020 Summer Olympics
Place of birth missing (living people)